Municipal elections were held in Toronto, Ontario, Canada, on January 1, 1925. Thomas Foster was elected mayor ousting incumbent Wesley Hiltz. The election included a referendum where voters passed a motion in favour of building a new water plant. This eventually became the R. C. Harris Water Treatment Plant.

Toronto mayor
Hilz had been elected to office the year previously. he was challenged for the mayoralty by long serving politician Thomas Foster. Foster won by a narrow margin in what was a very low turnout election. Two fringe candidates with no previous elected office also ran.

Results
Thomas Foster - 32,885
Wesley Hiltz - 31,408
Harry Winberg - 2,263
Samuel Fieldhouse - 282

Board of Control
There were two new members of the Board of Control returned in this election: D.C. MacGregor and labour leader William D. Robbins. Defeated was R.H. Cameron, a close ally of the mayor.

Results
Joseph Gibbons (incumbent) - 39,299
A.E. Hacker (incumbent) - 34,369
William D. Robbins - 33,172
D.C. MacGregor - 30,326
R.H. Cameron (incumbent) - 29,086
James Simpson - 14,573
James Birks - 4,321

City council
Ward 1 (Riverdale)
Robert Luxton (incumbent) - acclaimed
George J. Smith (incumbent) - acclaimed
W.A. Summerville (incumbent) - acclaimed

Ward 2 (Cabbagetown and Rosedale)
Bert Wemp (incumbent) - 4,059
John Winnett (incumbent) - 3,482
Charles A. Risk (incumbent) - 3,293
Herbert Henry Ball - 2,913
A.E. Brocklesby - 3,301

Ward 3 (Central Business District and The Ward)
Harry W. Hunt (incumbent) - 3,458
J. George Ramsden - 2,974
Joseph Singer - 2,685
Andrew Carrick (incumbent) - 2,476
John Boland - 1,887
John R. Beamish - 1,790
Charles Mogrdige - 613

Ward 4 (Kensington Market and Garment District)
Nathan Phillips (incumbent) - 3,282
Sam McBride (incumbent) - 2,889
Claude Pearce (incumbent) - 2,827
Ian Macdonnell  - 2,479
James Muldowney - 516

Ward 5 (Trinity-Bellwoods)
Clifford Blackburn (incumbent) - 5,262
Benjamin Miller (incumbent) - 3,934
William James Stewart (incumbent) - 3,703
Wesley Benson - 2,567
Sumner Graham - 2,280
John Macdonald - 1,349
Arthur E. Fegan - 754

Ward 6 (Davenport and Parkdale)
Brook Sykes (incumbent) - 8,477
Samuel Thomas Wright (incumbent) - 7,488
John Laxton (incumbent) - 5,676
Guy Roach - 4,716
Richard Tuthill - 2,318
James Gill - 825

Ward 7 (West Toronto Junction)
Samuel Ryding (incumbent) - 3,646
Frank Whetter (incumbent) - 3,385
W.A. Baird - 3,303
Robert Hall - 398
James Morrow -375

Ward 8 (East Toronto)
Robert Dibble (incumbent) - 5,846
Robert Baker (incumbent) - 5,427
William Robertston - 3,993
Joseph Turner (incumbent) - 3,867
Florence Custance - 819

Results taken from the January 1, 1925 Toronto Daily Star and might not exactly match final tallies.

References
Election Coverage. Toronto Star. January 1, 1925

1925 elections in Canada
1925
1925 in Ontario